The 40th Ward is one of 50 wards that make up the Chicago City Council.

The ward includes several diverse neighborhoods surrounding Rosehill Cemetery, including Lincoln Square, Budlong Woods, Bowmanville, West Ridge, Edgewater and West Andersonville. The area is bordered approximately by the Chicago River to the West, Lawrence Avenue to the South, and Clark Street to the East. The boundaries of the ward changed slightly before the 2015 election [see map].

Alderman 
The ward is represented in the Chicago City Council by an alderman, a position that comes up for election every 4 years. In the 2019 election, Andre Vasquez, a Democratic Socialist, won 54% of the vote to become the alderman of the 40th Ward.

The previous aldermen for the 40th Ward include the following men:
 Seymour Simon (1971–1975)
 Solomon Gutstein (1975–1979)
 Ivan Rittenberg (1979–1983)
 Patrick J. O'Connor (1983–2019)

Schools 
The 40th Ward is home to a variety of public and private schools.

Chicago Public Schools:
 Budlong Elementary
 Chappell Elementary
 Clinton Elementary
 Jamieson Elementary 
 Amundsen High School
 Mather High School
Private/religious schools:
 North Shore Junior Academy
 Rogers Park Montessori
 St. Hilary Catholic School 
 St. Matthias School 
 St. Phillips Lutheran School

Police beats 
Chicago is divided into 279 Chicago Police Department beats, eight of which are in the 40th Ward (see map). Each beat has a number. The first two digits signify the district; the next digit shows the sector number, and the last digit is the beat number. For example, Beat 2013 is the 20th District, 1st sector, 3rd beat. All patrol cars are labeled with a beat number displayed above the blue lights on the roof. Beats hold regular meetings that are open to the public, usually once a month, or every other month. The list of beat meetings is available on the 40th Ward website.

Neighborhood organizations 
The 40th Ward is made up of diverse communities, several of which have organized neighborhood groups. They include
 Heart of Lincoln Square Neighbors Association (HOLS)
 Bowmanville Community Organization (BCO)
 Greater Rockwell Organization (GRO)
 West Andersonville Neighbors Together (WANT)
 Winnemac Park Neighbors (WPN)

References 

City of Chicago Wards